Amy Truesdale (born 20 January 1989) is a taekwondo practitioner who won Gold at the 2014 and 2017 Para Taekwondo World Championships. She was born without a left hand or forearm. She has been a competitor in Para Taekwondo since 2009

She won one of the bronze medals in the women's +58 kg event at the 2020 Summer Paralympics in Tokyo, Japan.

References 

1989 births
Living people
English female taekwondo practitioners
Taekwondo practitioners at the 2020 Summer Paralympics
Paralympic bronze medalists for Great Britain
Paralympic medalists in taekwondo
Medalists at the 2020 Summer Paralympics
21st-century English women